Douglas Rodrigues or Rodríguez may refer to:

Douglas Rodrigues (footballer) (born 1982), Brazilian footballer
Douglas Rodríguez (boxer) (1950–2012), Cuban boxer